A referendum on a new constitution was held in American Samoa on 4 November 1986.  Voters were asked to approve a proposed constitution developed by a Constitutional Council.  The measure failed and the 1960 constitution remained in force.

References

1986 in American Samoa
Constitutional referendums in American Samoa
1986 referendums